Psalm 144 is the 144th psalm of the Book of Psalms, part of the final Davidic collection of psalms, comprising Psalms 138 to 145, which are specifically attributed to David in their opening verses. In the King James Version its opening words are "Blessed be the  my strength which teacheth my hands to war, and my fingers to fight". In Latin, it is known as "Benedictus Dominus".

In the slightly different numbering system used in the Greek Septuagint version of the Bible, and the Latin Vulgate, this psalm is Psalm 143.

The psalm is used as a regular part of Jewish, Catholic, Lutheran, Anglican and other Protestant liturgies; it has often been set to music.

Text

Hebrew Bible version 
The following is the Hebrew text of Psalm 144:

King James Version 
 Blessed be the LORD my strength which teacheth my hands to war, and my fingers to fight:
 My goodness, and my fortress; my high tower, and my deliverer; my shield, and he in whom I trust; who subdueth my people under me.
 LORD, what is man, that thou takest knowledge of him! or the son of man, that thou makest account of him!
 Man is like to vanity: his days are as a shadow that passeth away.
 Bow thy heavens, O LORD, and come down: touch the mountains, and they shall smoke.
 Cast forth lightning, and scatter them: shoot out thine arrows, and destroy them.
 Send thine hand from above; rid me, and deliver me out of great waters, from the hand of strange children;
 Whose mouth speaketh vanity, and their right hand is a right hand of falsehood.
 I will sing a new song unto thee, O God: upon a psaltery and an instrument of ten strings will I sing praises unto thee.
 It is he that giveth salvation unto kings: who delivereth David his servant from the hurtful sword.
 Rid me, and deliver me from the hand of strange children, whose mouth speaketh vanity, and their right hand is a right hand of falsehood:
 That our sons may be as plants grown up in their youth; that our daughters may be as corner stones, polished after the similitude of a palace:
 That our garners may be full, affording all manner of store: that our sheep may bring forth thousands and ten thousands in our streets.
 That our oxen may be strong to labour; that there be no breaking in, nor going out; that there be no complaining in our streets.
 Happy is that people, that is in such a case: yea, happy is that people, whose God is the LORD.

Themes
The text is attributed to David in the Masoretic text. The Jerusalem Bible notes that the psalm has two parts: it refers to verses 1-11 as a "war hymn" and suggests that verses 12-15 portray "the fruits of victory", and also by extension "the prosperity of the messianic age".

Verse 1
The first verse is rendered in the King James Version (KJV) as 
 "Blessed be the LORD my strength, which teacheth my hands to war, and my fingers to fight."
This translates the Hebrew:
 

Thus, in KJV "my strength" renders צורי (lit. "my rock").

But the Septuagint has 

putting  "my God" where the Hebrew has "my rock/strength".
This was the text rendered by the Vulgata Clementina, 

This Latin translation was the one which was influential in Western Christianity during the Middle Ages. With the development of the ideal of the knighthood in the 12th century, the verse came to be seen as a fitting prayer for the Christian warrior, and references to it are found inscribed on a number of high medieval swords, most notably on the pommel of the Imperial Sword of Otto IV (made c. 1198).

Verse 12
That our sons may be as plants grown up in their youth;That our daughters may be as pillars,
Sculptured in palace style.
The Jerusalem Bible suggests that the psalmist may have in mind a caryatid, a sculpted female figure serving as an architectural support.

Use

Judaism
This psalm is recited in some congregations before Maariv on Motzei Shabbat. Verse 15 is the second verse of Ashrei and is also the eighth verse of Hoshia Et Amecha in Pesukei Dezimra. The 15th verse of the psalm is the prayer of Ashrei, and in zemirot.

Catholicism
This psalm was selected to the office of Vespers by St. Benedict of Nursia in 530 AD. It was therefore traditionally performed during Vespers of Friday, according to the Rule of St. Benedict. As Psalm 144 is long enough, Benedict divided it in two. So verses from Deus canticum novum cantabo tibi were his division, and vespers Friday had only three psalms instead of four.

In the Liturgy of the Hours, Psalm 144 is recited during Vespers on Thursday of the fourth week. The main cycle of liturgical prayers takes four weeks.

In the Divine Worship: Daily Office, the daily Divine Office of the Anglican Use Personal Ordinariates, Psalm 144 is recited at Morning Prayer on the 30th and 31st Day of the month in the 30-day Prayer Book cycle or at Morning Prayer on Saturday of the 7th Week in the 7 week cycle.

Musical settings

Michel Richard Delalande, composer of Louis XIV, wrote a grand motet in 1695 for this Psalm (S.44) for the offices celebrated in the Royal Chapel of Versailles.

German poet Matthias Claudius wrote a poem entitled "Wir pflügen und wir streuen" (in English: "We plough the fields and scatter") which was inspired by Psalm 144 and was published in 1782. This poem was set to music in 1800 by Johann Abraham Peter Schulz. The lyrics were translated into English in 1862 by Jane Montgomery Campbell, and since that time We Plough the Fields and Scatter has become a popular hymn that is particularly associated with celebrations of the harvest season.

Antonin Dvorak set a verse from the psalm in Czech as the beginning of the fifth movement of his Biblical Songs.

In film
On display in the Museum of the Bible are some clips from the film Saving Private Ryan where Daniel Jackson quotes Psalm 22:19, 25:2 and Psalm 144:2.

Usage as a gun engraving
In September 2015, a gun shop in Apopka, Florida produced an AR-15 named the "Crusader" engraved with Psalm 144:1, ostensibly so that it could "never… be used by Muslim terrorists". The Council on American–Islamic Relations responded with disapproval.

References

Sources
Nosson Scherman, The Complete Artscroll Siddur (1984), Mesorah Publications, .

External links 

 
 
 Text of Psalm 144 according to the 1928 Psalter
 Psalms Chapter 144 text in Hebrew and English, mechon-mamre.org
 Psalm 144 – War and Peace text and detailed commentary, enduringword.com
 Of David. / Blessed be the LORD, my rock, wo trains my hands for battle, my fingers for war Text and footnotes, usccb.org United States Conference of Catholic Bishops
 Psalm 144:1 introduction and text, biblestudytools.com
 Psalm 144 / Refrain: Happy are the people who have the Lord for their God. Church of England
 Psalm 144 at biblegateway.com
Hymnary.org, Hymns for Psalm 144

144
Works attributed to David